Sir William Blackstone is a bronze statue by Paul Wayland Bartlett of the English legal scholar William Blackstone. It is located at E. Barrett Prettyman United States Courthouse, at 333 Pennsylvania Avenue in northwest Washington, D.C., in the Judiciary Square neighborhood.

It was installed on August 11, 1943.

See also
 List of public art in Washington, D.C., Ward 6

References

External links
 

1920 sculptures
Artworks in the collection of the National Park Service
Bronze sculptures in Washington, D.C.
Judiciary Square
Outdoor sculptures in Washington, D.C.
Sculptures of men in Washington, D.C.
Statues in Washington, D.C.
1943 establishments in Washington, D.C.